Cryptobatrachidae is a family of frogs belonging to the order Anura.

Genera:
 Cryptobatrachus
 Stefania

References

Hyloidea
Amphibian families